Hugo Miguel Martins Carreira (born 10 March 1979) is a Portuguese former professional footballer who played as a central defender.

Club career
Born in Lisbon, Carreira started his professional career at local F.C. Barreirense. After two seasons he was acquired by La Liga club Deportivo de La Coruña, but would never play in any first-team games during three seasons.

For the 2001–02 campaign, Carreira joined C.F. Estrela da Amadora in the second division. After a brief spell with C.D. Nacional in Madeira, with which he made his Primeira Liga debut, he returned to the Lisbon-based side, being relatively used in his six-year spell.

In March 2009, Carreira left Estrela which was facing a severe economic crisis, and moved to China's Qingdao Jonoon FC. In the following year he moved teams – and countries – again, signing for AEP Paphos FC of Cyprus.

External links

1979 births
Living people
Footballers from Lisbon
Portuguese footballers
Association football defenders
Portugal youth international footballers
Portugal under-21 international footballers
Primeira Liga players
Liga Portugal 2 players
Segunda Divisão players
F.C. Barreirense players
C.F. Estrela da Amadora players
C.D. Nacional players
Portimonense S.C. players
Atlético Clube de Portugal players
G.D. Fabril players
Segunda División B players
Tercera División players
Deportivo Fabril players
Chinese Super League players
Qingdao Hainiu F.C. (1990) players
Cypriot First Division players
AEP Paphos FC players
Portuguese expatriate footballers
Expatriate footballers in Spain
Expatriate footballers in China
Expatriate footballers in Cyprus
Portuguese expatriate sportspeople in Spain
Portuguese expatriate sportspeople in China
Portuguese expatriate sportspeople in Cyprus